Vahide Aydın (born 3 October 1968 in Turkey) is an Austrian-Turkish politician and social worker.

Politics
In 2000 Aydın joined the Greens and became a member of the Open Dornbirn as a city representative. Since 2007 she has been the speaker of the Green migrants and by 2009 a Member of Parliament.

Personal life
Aydın is married and mother of two children.

References

External links
Vahide Aydın, Vorarlberg’de milletvekili seçildi

Austrian people of Turkish descent
Living people
The Greens – The Green Alternative politicians
1968 births
Turkish emigrants to Austria